Wolverine 1 may refer to:Marvel Comic's Wolverine
 The original version of Wolverine
 Wolverine (comic book)'s issue 1 or volume 1 or first title
 X-Men Origins: Wolverine, 2009 film, the first in the Wolverine film series

Other
 M10 Wolverine, the first US Army Wolverine
 USS Wolverine (IX-31), the first USS Wolverine HMS Wolverine (1798), the first HMS Wolverine''

See also
 Wolverine (disambiguation)
 Wolverine 2 (disambiguation)